The 1967 NAIA Soccer Championship was the ninth annual tournament held by the NAIA to determine the national champion of men's college soccer among its members in the United States.

Defending champions and hosts Quincy (IL) defeated Rockhurst in the final, 3–1, to claim the Hawks' second NAIA national title.

The final was played at Quincy College in Quincy, Illinois.

Bracket

See also  
 1967 NCAA Soccer Championship

References 

NAIA championships
NAIA
1967 in sports in Illinois